The Roman Catholic Diocese of Legazpi (Latin: Dioecesis Legazpiensis) is a diocese of the Latin Church of the Roman Catholic Church. It constitutes the entire province of Albay in the Philippines.

The diocese was erected in 1951, carved from territory of the Archdiocese of Cáceres, to which it is a suffragan. In 1974, the diocese was partitioned to form the Diocese of Virac.

Joel "Bong" Baylon is the current bishop of Legazpi, after serving as Bishop of Masbate. Prior to his appointment, Auxiliary Bishop of Legazpi Lucilo Quiambao had been the apostolic administrator of the diocese since Bishop Nestor Cariño's retirement in 2007. Baylon is assisted by his vicar-general, Ramón Tronqued, PC VG.

Coat of arms
The Mayon Volcano which towers over the city of Legazpi occupies the center of the shield. The papal cross surmounted by the nimbed dove symbolizes Saint Gregory the Great, the titular of the cathedral. The dove is an allusion to the testimony of Peter the Deacon who said that he oftentimes saw the Holy Ghost in the form of a dove hover above the saint while he dictated his works. The rose symbolizes Our Lady of Peñafrancia to whom all Bicolanos have a great devotion. The lily at the base represents the Immaculate Conception, the patroness of the principal church of Virac, Catanduanes in Catanduanes which belongs to the diocese (until 1974).

Bishops

Ordinaries

Auxiliary Bishops

Other priest of this diocese who became bishop
José Crisologo Sorra, appointed Bishop of Virac in 1974; later returned here as Bishop
Joel Zamudio Baylon, appointed Bishop of Masbate in 1998; later returned here as Bishop

See also
Catholic Church in the Philippines

References

External links

 

Legazpi
Legazpi
Christian organizations established in 1951
Roman Catholic dioceses and prelatures established in the 20th century
Religion in Albay
Legazpi, Albay
1951 establishments in the Philippines